The Ouse Bridge is a reinforced concrete plate girder bridge that spans River Ouse between Goole and Howden in the East Riding of Yorkshire, England. It carries the M62 and is situated between junctions 36 and 37. It was built between 1973 and 1976 by Costain and was designed by Scott Wilson Kirkpatrick & Partners. The bridge was officially opened to traffic on 24 May 1976 by nine-year-old Martin Brigham.

History
Traffic to and from Hull to the A1 historically went over Boothferry Bridge, on the A614, which was a swing bridge.

The position of the bridge and the M62 resulted from a study carried out in 1964 by Scott Wilson Kirkpatrick & Partners. They would also design the bridge. It is a haunched girder bridge.

Regional position
The extension of the M18 (from the current M180), the M62, and the first part of (what would become) the M180 (to Scunthorpe only) was announced in Hull in September 1965. At that time, it would be five years before the M62 would cross the Pennines, and the Humber Bridge would not be given firm funding until the 1966 Kingston upon Hull North by-election in January 1966. The extension of the M180 would also require a similar bridge over the Trent which, like the Ouse Bridge, was the final part of that motorway section to open (in 1979, three years later). The Humber Bridge began construction (on the south-side embankment) in July 1972, and the Ouse Bridge followed only six months later; both were being built at the same time, and the Humber Bridge opened five years after the Ouse Bridge. Costain built the  southern approach road from the Humber Bridge to the A1077 at the same time as the Ouse Bridge, including a 320m viaduct with seven concrete box spans. Both sides of the Humber and Ouse would be linked in February 1977. At the time of opening of the Ouse Bridge, the Humber Bridge was projected to cost £40 million, and to be completed by 1978. The M18 was projected, at the time, to open by mid-1978, but opened in February 1979.

Design
In the early stages an immersed tube tunnel was considered, which was thought to be too expensive. The superstructure was designed by Redpath Dorman Long and G Maunsell & Partners.  of the River Ouse had to be bridged. The area was in the Boothferry district of Humberside. The gradient of the road on the approach to the bridge is 1 in 33.

Construction

The Ouse Bridge Contract for £6.75 million (£ million in ) was awarded in January 1973 to a consortium of Costain Civil Engineering and Redpath Dorman Long.

These were carried out by Raymond International.

The steelwork was fabricated at RDL works in Teesside. There were steel supply problems. In July 1975 there was a partial collapse of a military trestle on pier 15.

Opening
It was opened on 24 May 1976 by nine-year-old Martin Brigham, who had been handed the scissors at the last moment by Minister of Transport John Gilbert, Baron Gilbert, who was to have opened it. It was the last section of the main part of the M62 to open, comprising . The M62 had taken 15 years and cost £190 million. The A63 Caves Bypass and M62 Balkholme sections (built by Clugston Construction) had opened on 19 February 1976. The Balkholme to Caves section was the first use on a UK motorway of continuously reinforced concrete pavement (CRCP), which has no transverse joints.

Repair
In 2022 a partial failure of a joint on the eastbound carriageway was identified after it was discovered that increased vibration from traffic had started to damage the concrete under lane three and a bridge joint, which allows the carriageway to expand and contract with the weather.   Temporary bridging plates were installed over the damaged bridge joints as a temporary mitigation measure followed by the critically damaged joints on the eastbound carriageway being replaced by spring 2023.

References

External links

 Motorway Archive
 Construction
 East Riding bridges
 Structurae

Bridges across the River Ouse, Yorkshire
Bridges completed in 1976
Bridges in the East Riding of Yorkshire
Concrete bridges in the United Kingdom
Motorway bridges in England
Plate girder bridges
Road bridges in England
1976 establishments in England
M62 motorway
Goole